Schießanlage is a firing range located in the Hochbrück area of Munich, Germany. For the 1972 Summer Olympics, it hosted the shooting and the shooting part of the modern pentathlon competition.

The total acreage used for the events was 240,000 square meters.

It served as the venue for the 2010 ISSF World Shooting Championships.

References
1972 Summer Olympics official report. Volume 2. Part 2. p. 203.
2010 ISSF World Shooting Championships preliminary program.

Venues of the 1972 Summer Olympics
Olympic modern pentathlon venues
Olympic shooting venues
Shooting ranges in Germany
Sports venues in Munich